Aprilia Hägglöf  (born 2 April 1983) is a Swedish snowboarder. 

She was born in Stockholm. She competed at the 2006 Winter Olympics, in parallel giant slalom.

Her husband Daniel Biveson is also an international snowboarder.

References

External links 
 

1983 births
Living people
Sportspeople from Stockholm
Swedish female snowboarders
Olympic snowboarders of Sweden
Snowboarders at the 2006 Winter Olympics
21st-century Swedish women